Gymnopilus subviridis is a species of mushroom in the family Hymenogastraceae.

See also

List of Gymnopilus species

External links
Gymnopilus subviridis at Index Fungorum

subviridis
Taxa named by William Alphonso Murrill